The Architect and the Emperor of Assyria is a 1967 play by Fernando Arrabal. It was produced by the Stratford Festival in 1970.

Notes

References 
 J. Alan B. Somerset (1991). The Stratford Festival Story, 1st edition.  Greenwood Press.  
 The Architect and the Emperor of Assyria (1977) by Fernando Arrabal – Director and composer: Tom O'Horgan (The Perlman Pages)

1967 plays
French plays